James O'Flynn (born 1995) is an Irish hurler who plays as a centre-back for club side Erin's Own and at inter-county level with the Cork senior hurling team. His brother, Robbie O'Flynn, also plays for both teams.

Career statistics

Inter-county

References

1995 births
Living people
UCC hurlers
Erin's Own (Cork) hurlers
Cork inter-county hurlers